The Polyxena sarcophagus is a late 6th century BCE sarcophagus from Hellespontine Phrygia, at the beginning of the period when it became a Province of the Achaemenid Empire. The sarcophagus was found in the Kızöldün tumulus, in the Granicus river valley, near Biga in the Province of Çanakkale in 1994. The area where the sarcophagus was found is located midway between Troy and Daskyleion, the capital of Hellespontine Phrygia.

This is the earliest stone sarcophagus with figural reliefs ever found in Asia Minor. The style is Late Archaic Greek and the sarcophagus dates to the last two decades of the 6th century BCE (520–500 BCE), or slightly later (500–490 BCE), based on stylistic analysis.

The reliefs represent a funerary celebration on three of its sides, and on the back what is believed to be the sacrifice of Polyxena, daughter of the king of Troy, Priam, by Neuptolemos in front of the tomb of his father Achilles.

The description of the sacrifice of Polixena may be suggestive of a hero cult for Achilles, usually only involving animal sacrifice, on the spot of a Troad tumulus where he may have been buried. Strabo (13.1.32) suggested that such a cult of Achilles existed in Troad:

The men shown in the reliefs are Greek, while the women are Trojans.

See also

 Altıkulaç Sarcophagus

References

Further reading
 
Sarcophagi
Archaeological discoveries in Turkey
1994 archaeological discoveries
6th-century BC works
Archaeology of the Achaemenid Empire
1994 in Turkey
Achaemenid Anatolia
Hellespontine Phrygia